Ayisi N. Makatiani is the Managing Partner and CEO of Fanisi Capital Ltd, which manages the Fanisi Venture Capital Fund for investing in East Africa (Kenya, Uganda, Tanzania and Rwanda). Makatiani has been featured in The Economist, Fortune (magazine), CNN, NHK, BBC, Financial Times (London).

Early life
Makatiani was educated at Alliance High School and thereafter Maseno School. He received a bachelor's degree in Electrical and Electronics Engineering from Massachusetts Institute of Technology (MIT), a Minor in Economics with a thesis done at the MIT Sloan School of Management.

Career

Since 2005, Makatiani has been an adviser to the President of the Republic of Kenya, as a member of the National Economic and Social Council (NESC). He currently sits on the boards of Kenya Airways and Ogilvy & Mather (East Africa). Makatiani has in the past been adviser to the UN Secretary General (Kofi Annan on ICT) and been on the board of Barclays Bank, Kenya, and on the advisory board of International Chamber of Commerce (ICC) E-Magazine, Paris, France; as well as being a former executive director of African Lakes Corporation PLC – London Stock Exchange listed.

Before Fanisi, Makatiani was the CEO of African Management Services Company (AMSCO)  a product of International Finance Corporation (IFC) — the World Bank's private-sector arm—the UN Development Programme (UNDP), and the African Development Bank. Before AMSCO he co-founded of Africa Online, the largest Internet Service Provider across Africa with operations in 10 countries spanning the whole continent. He is also the chairman of the board of directors for Jambojet, a low-cost carrier fully owned by Kenya Airways  as well as Chairman of Cayman Engineering Group, a family petroleum exploration and engineering firm in Africa, co-managed by his son Israel Brandons Nitendo

References

External links

AFRICA'S NEW CLASS OF POWER PLAYERS- The Christian Science Monitor
Ayisi Makatiani - National Economic & Social Council of Kenya (NESC)
Ayisi Makatiani, champion of small business in Africa - The Economist Aug 3rd 2006
Ayisi Makatiani Founder, Africa Online - Fortune (magazine)
Mapping a pan-African market- Red Herring (magazine)
  Excellence is not an accident- The EastAfrican
Young Global Hotshots - Off The Fence;  Amsterdam, Bristol, Cape Town, Singapore
http://www.amsco.org

Kenyan businesspeople
MIT Sloan School of Management alumni
Kenyan chief executives
1966 births
Living people
Alumni of Maseno School
Alumni of Alliance High School (Kenya)